The halldorophone (also known as the dorophone, and dórófónn in Icelandic) is a cello-like electronic instrument created by artist and designer Halldór Úlfarsson. The halldorophone is designed specifically to feedback the strings, making use of the phenomena of positive feedback to incite the strings to drone. The instrument gained some recognition in early 2020 when composer Hildur Guðnadóttir won the Academy Award for her original soundtrack to the movie Joker, some of which was composed with a halldorophone.

Operating principles 

The halldorophone is an electroacoustic instrument which makes use of positive feedback as a key element in generating its sound. The player takes a sitting position behind the instruments and plays it a similar way as they would a cello. The instrument is predicated on audio feedback which is generated when sound picked up by a microphone (or comparable device) is passed to a speaker and then re-detected by the microphone. It causes amplification in the system and a sustained, recursive signal flow is created; a positive feedback loop.

In the words of composer Nicole Robson: "The halldorophone utilises a simple system, whereby the vibration of each string is detected by a pickup, amplified and routed to a speaker embedded in the back of the instrument. By adding gain to individual strings in the feedback loop, the instrument's response can become rapidly complex, potentially spinning out of control. While every musical performance of a piece is unique in some way and contingent on its particular moment and situation in time, the unstable nature of the halldorophone exacerbates this condition."

Electronics engineer Orfeas Moraitis who has worked on halldorophone electronics with Halldor Ulfarsson since 2018 recorded an instructional video for an experimental version of the instrument at Elektronmusikstudion in Stockholm at the start of summer in 2022 at the occasion of the instrument being on loan to EMS and available to users along with other studio instruments and equipment.

Uses

Concert music 
A number of pieces have been composed and performed for solo halldorophone, halldorophone in duet with a second instrument and with ensemble.

Several composers of the Icelandic S.L.Á.T.U.R. collective have used halldorophones in their works ever since the Hljóðheimar exhibition in Reykjavík 2011.

One of these composers Hafdís Bjarnadóttir's piece "A Day in February", for halldorophone and accordion was nominated by the Icelandic National Broadcasting Service for the International Rostrum of Composers in Vienna in 2011. 

Another S.L.Á.T.U.R. composer Guðmundur Steinn Gunnarsson's (IS) suite for solo halldorophone "Hafið og Örninn" was premiered at Hljóðön concert series by Finnish cellist Markus Hohti in 2015. His chamber opera Einvaldsóður which was premiered on Sláturtíð 2017  also makes an extended use of the halldorophone in a chamber music context. It was selected as one of the top 5 pieces of its decade in Aesthetics for Birds.

Nicole Robson (UK) performed a study for solo (digital) halldorophone "Dual/duel/duet/for/with/halldorophone" at NIME (New Interfaces for Musical Expression conference) in 2020.

Secondson (UK) performed at The National Museum of Wales for the improvised performance 8 with Super Furry Animals' Cian Ciaran, The Gentle Good and others on 19 August 2019 with the halldorophone.  The very first live performance with halldorophone in the UK. 

Johan Svensson (SE) has composed two works for halldorophone and a second instrument: 
Piece for halldorophone and viola (2012)
Composition for DIMI-A and halldorophone [music and video] in collaboration with Halldór Úlfarsson (2014)

Timothy Page (US/FI) premiered 'Toccata" for halldorophone, clarinet, electronics at Nordic Music Days in Stockholm in 2012 

In May of 2022, at a Latin American-themed festival by the Louisville Orchestra in Kentucky, the Emmy-winning composer Adam Schoenberg premiered his piece Automation. It is a double concerto for orchestra, cello, and a custom built halldorophone. The conductor, Teddy Abrams, said using the electronic instrument was in keeping with the energy of the city and the orchestra's history, both daring and adventurous.

Film music 

In 2016, composer Jóhann Jóhannsson recorded Hildur Guðnadóttir playing halldorophone for his score of the motion picture Arrival (film).

In 2018, Icelandic composer Hildur Guðnadóttir scored the film Sicario: Day of the Soldado using a halldorophone, which she claimed was her main instrument at the time, calling it an "electro-acoustic feedback monster" and a "Jimi Hendrix cello".

In 2019, Hildur Guðnadóttir played and composed the original soundtrack to the movie Joker using a halldorophone. The score won the Academy Award the following year.

Studio recordings 

Drone metal band Sunn O))) recorded halldorophone with Steve Albini at Electrical Audio for their eighth studio album Life Metal, released in 2019.

Halldorotones a collection of short pieces for solo halldorophone was released by Broken Strings Music in 2020.

Secondson (UK) released "Suite for halldorophone and Synthi A" on 8 February 2021, a 21 minute long ascending drone piece.  He also released the score "Tónlist frá: hér að neðan" on 1 October 2019 which features the halldorophone and Yamaha CS60 extensively.

The Icelandic electro-psychedelic-post-hip-hop-pop collective Cryptochrome (IS) released their Secondson (UK) produced EP "Love Life" on 2 February 2020 which features the halldorophone on the song 'Kali.'

Secondson (UK) released the solo halldorophone album "Any Other Place" on March 21, 2022, via SFDB Records.  Recorded in the crypt at the Temple of Peace and Health in Cardiff.

Video games 

In 2021, composer Hildur Guðnadóttir composed the video-game score for Battlefield 2042 by DICE (company) and EA Games using the halldorophone. The soundtrack was released 10 September 2021.

History 

The instrument was originally conceived of as a prop for performance art during Halldór's time as a visual arts student. Starting out as kind of a joke, he says, but in time developed into a functional string instrument for string players interested in working with feedback.

References

External links 
 

Cellos
Electronic musical instruments
Amplified instruments